Electoral history of William Henry Harrison, who served as the 9th president of the United States (1841); United States Minister to Gran Colombia (1828–1829); United States senator from Ohio (1825–1828); United States representative from Ohio (1816–1819) and as the first governor of the Indiana Territory (1801–1812).

House races

1816

1822

Senate races

1821

1822

1825

Presidential elections

1836

1840

References 

William Henry Harrison
Harrison, William Henry
Harrison, William Henry